Antonio Montero Moreno (28 August 1928 – 16 June 2022) was a Spanish Roman Catholic prelate.

Montero Moreno was born in Churriana de la Vega and was ordained to the priesthood in 1951. He served as auxiliary bishop of the Roman Catholic Archdiocese of Seville and was titular bishop of Regiana from 1969 to 1980. Montero then served as bishop of the Roman Catholic Diocese of Badajoz, Spain. from 1980 to 1994. He then served as archbishop of the Roman Catholic Archdiocese of Mérida-Badajoz, Spain, from 1994 until his retirement in 2004.

References

1928 births
2022 deaths
20th-century Roman Catholic bishops in Spain
20th-century Roman Catholic archbishops in Spain
21st-century Roman Catholic archbishops in Spain
Bishops of Badajoz
Bishops appointed by Pope Paul VI
Bishops appointed by Pope John Paul II
Pontifical University of Salamanca alumni
Pontifical Gregorian University alumni